Giuseppe Dallamano (1679–1758) was an Italian painter of the late-Baroque period. Born in Modena, he was active in painting quadratura in Turin.

References

1679 births
1758 deaths
17th-century Italian painters
Italian male painters
18th-century Italian painters
Painters from Modena
Italian Baroque painters
Rococo painters
Quadratura painters
18th-century Italian male artists